Brasilinvest Group - Brazilian company, established in 1975 by Mário Garnero, Headquarters in São Paulo.

Over its 35 years of history, the Brasilinvest Group has consolidated the assembly of dozens of economic projects and entrepreneurial management, from the transference and nationalization of ITT-Standard Electric SA and NEC, in the 1980s, to the assessment, in the 1990s, of the new partnership structure of Cofap and Bombril. It also assisted the stock-option restructuring of Fiat, the creation of Volkswagen’s leasing unit, as well as Varig and Volkswagen's rent-a-car units.

In the agribusiness sector, it has assisted the process of industrial installation of Boehringer in Suape, Pernambuco, and taken part in enterprises such as Celupa (Paper and Cellulose Industrial Company Guaiba) and Mellita.

In addition, the Brasilinvest Group has and important international profile, with partners in 16 countries and prominent representatives from all around the world who are part of the group's Board of Advisors. Brasilinvest has been a pioneer in discussing themes such as globalization and its effects on the Brazilian market, with the planning, along with the Forum of the Americas, of important conferences and events aiming to promote investment opportunities in Brazil, with particular distinction to the Salzburg Conference in, Austria (1975), and events in the Principality of Monaco (2000), Paris (2003), Rome (2004), London (2005), and in New York City (2007-2008). It has led equally important business initiatives in the Asian market, with the increase in commercial and capital exchange through the establishment of the first Brazilian representation office in Beijing, China, back in 1981.

Brasilinvest has also a strong history in real estate projects, being responsible for the development of over 3.7 million square meters of edifications in the State of São Paulo alone, as well as important real estate projects in the United States of America and Europe.

The Brasilinvest Group currently ranks number 128 on the annual report of Brazil's largest corporations, published by Brazilian financial magazine Gazeta Mercantil.

In 1985 the Central Bank of Brazil liquidated Brasilinvest. The irregularities found led the then Minister of Finance, Francisco Dornelles, to seek the preventive detention of Mário Garnero . The Communications Minister Antônio Carlos Magalhães suspended the payment of a debt of equivalent US$30 million from a contract to supply equipment already delivered by NEC Brasil to Telebrás. The transfer of NEC Brasil 's shareholding control from entrepreneur Mário Garnero to publisher Roberto Marinho was consummated in October 1986.

References

External links
 Brasilinvest Website
 The Hour of the Nightmare: So You Want to Invest in Brazilian Real Estate?
 Beyond Citizen Kane

Banks of Brazil
Companies based in São Paulo
Companies of Brazil
Banks established in 1975
Financial services companies established in 1975